Armando González (born 20 April 1940) is a Uruguayan long-distance runner. He competed in the marathon at the 1968 Summer Olympics.

References

1940 births
Living people
Athletes (track and field) at the 1968 Summer Olympics
Uruguayan male long-distance runners
Uruguayan male marathon runners
Olympic athletes of Uruguay
Sportspeople from Montevideo